Shark Attack is a 1999 television action thriller film by Lionsgate that first premiered on HBO directed by Bob Misiorowski and starring Casper Van Dien, Jenny McShane and Ernie Hudson. In a once tranquil African fishing village, a marine biologist searches for answers when his friend becomes a victim in a series of brutal shark attacks.

Plot
When marine biologist Steven McKray learns that a friend died in a mysterious shark attack in South Africa, he decides to find out what really happened. Upon arriving in the village, he meets Lawrence Rhodes, a local hotel owner, and scientist Miles Craven, who informs Steven of the mysterious increase in shark attacks in the area. When Steven teams up with his late friend's sister for a fact-finding dive, they make a surprising discovery.

Cast
 Casper Van Dien as Steven McKray
 Ernie Hudson as Lawrence Rhodes
 Jenny McShane as Corinne Desantis
 Cordell McQueen as Marc Desantis
 Bentley Mitchum as Dr. Miles Craven
 Chris Olley as police chief 
 Jacob Makgoba as machete policeman
 Paul Ditchfield as professor Bookman
 Anton Dekker as Jan
 Tony Caprari as Mani
 Dave Ridley as Mr. Hacker
 Simo Magwase as Tanka
 Mike Mvelase as Mabunda
 Kwesi Malinga as Mrs. Rhodes
 Twelopele Tsotsotso as Tadesse
 Douglas Bristow as doctor Puri
 Caroline Barkhuizen as night nurse
 Pepsy Mahunisi as elder leader
 Eloise Cupido as hotel desk clerk
 Bradley Meyer as boy in the boat
 Roly Jansen as fishing tourist on the boat

Reception
On Rotten Tomatoes the film has an approval rating of 0% based on reviews from 5 critics.

Scott Weinberg of eFilmCritic.com gave it 2/5 and called it "hilariously bad (and therefore entertaining) Z- grade shark horror".
Michael Dequina at TheMovieReport.com was critical of the film saying "the title takes a back seat to some boring conspiracy mumbo-jumbo".

Sequels
Two direct-to-video sequels followed Shark Attack. Shark Attack 2 was released in 2000, while Shark Attack 3: Megalodon was released in 2002. Shark Attack 2 briefly mentions the events of the first film while Shark Attack 3: Megalodon ignores the first two movies entirely and acts as a stand-alone sequel to them.

See also
 List of killer shark films

References

External links
 
 Query's Corner Feature Review
 Black Horror Movies: Shark Attack feature
 Qwipster's: review by Vince Leo

1999 horror films
1999 television films
1999 films
Nu Image films
Films about shark attacks
American horror television films
Films set in Cape Town
1990s English-language films
1990s American films